The Great Unknown (German:Der große Unbekannte) is a 1927 German silent crime film directed by Manfred Noa and starring Jack Trevor, Arthur Kraußneck and Andrée Lafayette. It is based on a novel by Edgar Wallace.

The film's sets were designed by the art director Karl Machus. It was shot at the Bavaria Studios in Munich.

Cast
 Jack Trevor as Major Paul Roy Amery  
 Arthur Kraußneck as Maurice Tarn  
 Andrée Lafayette as Else Marlowe, Tarns Mündel  
 Eugen Neufeld as Inspektor Wille von Scotland Yard 
 Ernst Reicher as Polizeikommissar Bickerson 
 Evi Eva as Jessie Damm  
 Nien Soen Ling as Feng Ho  
 John Loder as Dr. Ralf Hallam  
 Kurt Gerron as Bankier Tupperwill  
 Sig Arno as Mauropolus  
 Hugo Werner-Kahle as Mr. Damm, Jessies Vater  
 Ruth Weyher

References

Bibliography
 Bergfelder, Tim. International Adventures: German Popular Cinema and European Co-Productions in the 1960s. Berghahn Books, 2005.

External links

1927 films
Films of the Weimar Republic
Films directed by Manfred Noa
German silent feature films
Films based on British novels
Films based on works by Edgar Wallace
Films set in England
1927 crime films
German black-and-white films
Bavaria Film films
Films shot at Bavaria Studios
Films set in London
German crime films
1920s German films
1920s German-language films